This is a partial list of government agencies of South Korea, under the executive branch.

Ministries

Ministry of Culture, Sports and Tourism (문화체육관광부, 文化體育觀光部)
Ministry of Education  (교육부, 敎育科學技術部)
Ministry of Environment (환경부, 環境部)
 Ministry of Agriculture, Food and Rural Affairs (농림축산식품부, 農林水産食品部)
 Ministry of Foreign Affairs (외교부, 外交通商部)
 Ministry of Gender Equality and Family (여성가족부, 女性部)
Ministry of Government Legislation (법제처, 法制處)
Ministry for Health and Welfare (보건복지부, 保健福祉部)
 Ministry of Justice (법무부, 法務部)
Ministry of Trade, Industry, and Energy (산업통상자원부, 産業通商資源部)
Ministry of Employment and Labor (고용노동부, 勞動部)
 Ministry of Land, Infrastructure and Transport (국토교통부, 國土海洋部)
 Ministry of National Defense (국방부, 國防部)
 Ministry of Patriots and Veterans Affairs (국가보훈처, 國家報勳處)
 Ministry of the Interior and Safety (행정안전부, 行政安全部)
 Ministry of Economy and Finance (기획재정부, 企劃財政部)
Ministry of Unification (통일부, 統一部)
Ministry of Science and ICT (과학기술정보통신부)

Independent agencies

National Security Council
Advisory Council on Democratic and Peaceful Unification
Presidential Council on Science and Technology
Presidential Commission on Small and Medium Business
Civil Service Commission
Korea Independent Commission Against Corruption
Truth Commission on Suspicious Deaths
Board of Audit and Inspection
National Intelligence Service
Government Information Agency
Fair Trade Commission
National Tax Service
National Statistical Office
Supreme Public Prosecutor
Military Manpower Administration
National Police Agency
National Police Commission
Korea Meteorological Administration
Cultural Properties Administration
Rural Development Administration
Korea Forest Service
Small and Medium Business Administration
Korean Intellectual Property Office
Ministry of Food and Drug Safety
National Maritime Police Agency
Korea Creative Content Agency
Korean Asset Management Company (KAMCO)
KOTRA (Korea Trade Promotion Corporation)

See also 

 Government of South Korea

South
Government agencies
Government agencies